The following highways are numbered 756:

Canada
Alberta Highway 756
Saskatchewan Highway 756

Costa Rica
 National Route 756

United States